Alstahaug is a municipality in Nordland county, Norway. It is part of the Helgeland region. The administrative centre of the municipality is the town of Sandnessjøen. Some of the villages in Alstahaug include Søvika and Tjøtta.

Most residents of Alstahaug live in the town of Sandnessjøen which is situated on the island of Alsta. The characteristic Seven Sisters mountain range is found on the eastern part of the island. Local legend has made this chain of peaks into seven sisters, two adjacent peaks representing twin sisters.

The island is connected to the mainland via the large Helgeland Bridge along Norwegian County Road 17. The Sandnessjøen Airport, Stokka is located 10 km south of Sandnessjøen.

The  municipality is the 307th largest by area out of the 356 municipalities in Norway. Alstahaug is the 136th most populous municipality in Norway with a population of 7,333.

General information
The large municipality of Alstahaug was established on 1 January 1838 (see formannskapsdistrikt law). In 1862, the southern district (population: 2,781) was separated to become the new municipality of Tjøtta (Vevelstad Municipality was later separated from Tjøtta). This left Alstahaug with about 3,280 residents. Just two years later, in 1864, the western island district (population: 2,438) was separated to become the new municipality of Herøy. Then on 1 July 1899, the northern district (population: 2,673) was separated to form the new municipality of Stamnes (Leirfjord Municipality was later separated from Stamnes).

During the 1960s, there were many municipal mergers across Norway due to the work of the Schei Committee. On 1 January 1965, several major municipal changes took place. First, the Husvær island area of Alstahaug (population: 461) was transferred from Alstahaug to Herøy Municipality. On the same day, the following areas were merged to form the new, larger municipality of Alstahaug:
most of the municipality of Tjøtta, except the Skogsholmen area (population: 1,477)
the municipality of Sandnessjøen (population: 3,856)
the municipality of Alstahaug (population: 970)

On 1 January 1971, the Skålvær islands (population: 32) were transferred from Vega Municipality to Alstahaug. On 1 January 1995, the mainland areas of Alstahaug (population: 70) were transferred to Vefsn Municipality.

Name
The municipality (originally the parish) is named after the old Alstahaug farm since the first Alstahaug Church was built there. The first element is the genitive case of the name of the island  (now Alsta). The linguist Magnus Olsen believed this old island name means "eel grounds" and it was an old taboo word for the sea.

Coat of arms

The coat of arms was granted on 8 August 1986. The official blazon is "Argent, a fess engrailed azure". This means the arms have a field (background) that has a tincture of argent which means it is commonly colored white, but if it is made out of metal, then silver is used. The charge is a fess (bar) with engrailed edges running horizontally through the arms. The design symbolizes the Seven Sisters, a row of mountains in the area, mirrored in the clear waters of the fjord. The arms were designed by Jarle E. Henriksen.

Churches
The Church of Norway has three parishes within the municipality of Alstahaug. It is part of the Nord-Helgeland prosti (deanery) in the Diocese of Sør-Hålogaland.

History
At Alstahaug, on the southern end of the island of Alsta, lies the medieval Alstahaug Church, where the poet and minister Petter Dass worked around 1700. Tjøtta, an island south of Alsta, is the place where the famous Viking Hårek resided in the 11th century.

Nature

Birdlife
Lying just south of the Arctic Circle in an area that is known as Outer Helgeland, Alstahaug offers the visiting bird watcher a chance to do some birding in spectacular scenery, be it coastal or inland where The Seven Sisters mountain chain marks the boundary between the habitats. One of the better areas to birdwatch is Tjøtta. Here you will find the small nature reserve Ostjønna.

Geography
Alstahaug is a municipality consisting entirely of islands. Most residents live on the main islands of Alsta and Tjøtta, and Alstahaug stretches from the Skålvær island group in the west, to the Vefsnfjorden in the east, and to Mindlandet island to the south. The municipalities of Leirfjord, Vefsn, and Vevelstad lie to the east and Dønna, Herøy, and Vega lie to the north, west, and south, respectively.

Climate
The official weather station is located at Sandnessjøen Airport Stokka, on Alsten island. Alstahaug has a temperate oceanic climate (marine west coast climate). The record high was recorded July 2019, and the all-time low was recorded February 2010. The warmest high recorded in the municipality is  recorded July 2019 at Tjøtta island. The November record high  set 6 November 2003 is warmest November temperature recorded in Nordland.

Government
All municipalities in Norway, including Alstahaug, are responsible for primary education (through 10th grade), outpatient health services, senior citizen services, unemployment and other social services, zoning, economic development, and municipal roads. The municipality is governed by a municipal council of elected representatives, which in turn elect a mayor. The municipality falls under the Alstahaug District Court and the Hålogaland Court of Appeal.

Municipal council
The municipal council of Alstahaug is made up of 27 representatives that are elected to four year terms. The party breakdown of the council is as follows:

Mayors
The mayors of Alstahaug (incomplete list):

1968-1974: Torvald Kibsgaard (Ap)
1975-1983: Andreas Grimsø (H)
1984-1993: Gunnar Breimo (Ap)
1993-1999: Bill Rønning (Ap)
1999-2003: Bjarne Myhre (H)
2003-2004: Håkon Mørk (Sp)
2004-2007: Magne Greger (Ap)
2007-2011: Stig Sørra (H)
2011-2019: Bård Anders Langø (Ap)
2019–present: Peder Talseth (Sp)

Notable people 

 Peder Krabbe Gaarder (1814 in Alstahaug – 1883) a Norwegian jurist and political theorist
 Adam Arndtsen (1829 in Alstahaug – 1919) a Norwegian professor and physicist 
 Torolf Prytz (1858 in Alstahaug – 1938) a Norwegian architect, goldsmith and politician
 Einar Hole Moxnes (1921 in Alstahaug – 2006) a politician, Mayor of Åfjord, 1955 to 1966
 Tone Thiis Schjetne (1928–2015) a Norwegian sculptor, lived in Sandnessjøen
 Gunnar Breimo (born 1939 in Alstahaug) a politician and Mayor of Alstahaug, 1983 to 1993
 Odd Eriksen (1955–2023) a member of the Cabinet of Norway; recipient of the Polaris Award; one of two who stopped a plane hijacking in 2004
 Arve Moen Bergset (born 1972 in Sandnessjøen) a traditional folk singer, hardanger fiddler, and classical violinist
 Stian Theting (born 1976 in Sandnessjøen) a Norwegian footballer with over 500 club caps
 Rebekka Karijord (born 1976 in Sandnessjøen) a Stockholm-based musician and composer
 Sander Rølvåg (born 1990 in Sandnessjøen) a Norwegian curler

References

External links
Municipal fact sheet from Statistics Norway 
sandnessjoen.com – Local portal for Sandnessjøen and Alstahaug (in Norwegian)

Picture: Beach south of Sandnessjøen
Summer picture with the mountains in the background
Skeilia nature reserve 

 
Municipalities of Nordland
1838 establishments in Norway